Leptadenia is a genus of plants in the family Apocynaceae, first described as a genus in 1810. It is native to Africa, including Madagascar, as well as southwest Asia and the Indian Subcontinent.

Species
 Leptadenia arborea (Forssk.) Schweinf. - Sudan, Ethiopia 
 Leptadenia lancifolia (Schumach. & Thonn.) Decne. - tropical Africa 
 Leptadenia madagascariensis Decne. -  Madagascar  
 Leptadenia pyrotechnica (Forssk.) Decne. - widespread from Algeria to India 
 Leptadenia reticulata (Retz.) Wight & Arn. -  Madagascar

formerly included
transferred to other genera (Genianthus, Periploca)
 Leptadenia elliptica Blume synonym of  Genianthus ellipticus (Blume) Bakh. f.
 Leptadenia visciformis Vatke synonym of   Periploca visciformis (Vatke) K. Schum.

References

Apocynaceae genera
Asclepiadoideae